Jacobus Marthinus 'Kobus' Burger  (born 31 March 1964) is a South African former rugby union player that played two tests for the Springboks.

Playing career
Burger matriculated at Paarl Gymnasium in 1981 and represented the Western Province Schools team at the annual Craven Week tournament in 1980 and 1981. In 1980 his older brother, Schalk was also part of the Western Province team. Burger was selected for the South African Schools team in 1980 and 1981 and in 1980 he was the youngest player in history to be selected for the South African Schools team. Burger enrolled at Stellenbosch University in 1982 and was selected for the Western Province under–20 team and the South Africa Universities under–20 team. He made his senior provincial debut for Western Province in 1985 and once again his brother was part of the team. The brothers were also part of the Western Province team that won the Currie Cup in 1985. Also in the team were two other players with the surname Burger, the wing Niel Burger and the lock, Schalk Burger Snr.

Burger made his test debut for the Springboks against the World XV on 26 August 1989 at his home ground, Newlands in Cape Town. He also played in the second test against the World XV.

Test history

Accolades
In 1988, Burger was one of the five Young Players of the Year, along with Christian Stewart, Jacques du Plessis, Andre Joubert and JJ van der Walt.

See also
List of South Africa national rugby union players – Springbok no. 552
List of South Africa national under-18 rugby union team players

References

1964 births
Living people
South African rugby union players
South Africa international rugby union players
Western Province (rugby union) players
Alumni of Paarl Gimnasium
Hamilton RFC, Sea Point players
Sportspeople from Paarl
Rugby union players from the Western Cape
Rugby union centres
Rugby union wings